Someday Came Suddenly is the debut studio album by American metalcore band Attack Attack!. It was released on November 11, 2008, through Rise Records. The album's name derives from the third track, "Bro, Ashley's Here", and is the only album to include lead vocalist Austin Carlile. Many of the album's lyrics feature strong Christian themes.

Background 
Someday Came Suddenly was both recorded and released in 2008. Attack Attack! was signed to Rise Records soon after the surface of the band's previous release, an EP entitled If Guns Are Outlawed, Can We Use Swords?, which was also released during the same year. The band toured in-support of Someday Came Suddenly with Escape the Fate, Black Tide, William Control, and Burn Halo after it surfaced.

Five of the album's tracks, "Stick Stickly", "Party Foul", "What Happens If I Can't Check My MySpace When We Get There?", "The People's Elbow", and "Dr. Shavargo Pt. 3", are rerecorded, remastered and renamed versions of the tracks from their EP If Guns Are Outlawed, Can We Use Swords?.

Reception 

Someday Came Suddenly peaked at number 193 on the Billboard 200 and number 25 on the Independent Albums chart. Its highest peak was at number 9 on the Heatseekers Albums chart, where it spent 32 weeks. While the album was commercially a moderate success, it received generally mixed reviews, with praise for the heavier tracks and unclean vocals, and criticism of its electronic elements and use of auto-tune. Both Gregory Adams from The Georgia Straight and John McDonnell from The Guardian compared "Stick Stickly" to Basshunter music.

Singles 
The first single, "Stick Stickly", was released for digital download on June 4, 2008. It is named after the famous Nickelodeon character Stick Stickly, a popsicle stick voiced by Paul Christie that hosted the programming block Nick in the Afternoon, which aired between 1995 and 1998. The music video for "Stick Stickly" debuted on MTV Headbangers Ball in 2009. The video is infamous for starting the internet meme "crabcore", which features members of the band squatting in a "crab-like" stance whilst nodding their heads and playing their instruments.

The songs "Dr. Shavargo Pt. 3" and "The People's Elbow" were also released as singles. "Dr. Shavargo Pt. 3" also had a music video produced for it, which consists of a live performance with the song dubbed over. Neither video features Carlile as he was no longer a part of the band during their filmings. Instead his position in the videos was taken by the band's then-lead vocalist, Nick Barham.

Track listing

Personnel

Attack Attack!
 Austin Carlile – lead vocals
 Johnny Franck – clean vocals, guitars
 John Holgado – bass guitar
 Caleb Shomo – keyboards, programming, backing vocals
 Andrew Wetzel – drums
 Andrew Whiting – guitars

Production
 Joey Sturgis – producer, engineering, mixing, mastering
 Keaton Andrews – photography
 Sons of Nero – artwork

References

2008 debut albums
Attack Attack! albums
Rise Records albums
Albums with cover art by Sons of Nero
Albums produced by Joey Sturgis